Arthur Lawrence Alarcón (August 14, 1925 – January 28, 2015) was a United States circuit judge of the United States Court of Appeals for the Ninth Circuit.

Education and career

Born in Los Angeles, California, Alarcón was a Staff Sergeant in the United States Army from 1943 to 1946, then received a Bachelor of Arts degree from University of Southern California in 1949 and a Bachelor of Laws from USC Gould School of Law in 1951. He was a deputy district attorney in Los Angeles County, California from 1952 to 1961. He was a legal adviser and clemency and extraditions secretary to the Governor of California from 1961 to 1962, and an executive assistant to the Governor of California from 1962 to 1964. He briefly chaired the California parole board in 1964, and was then a judge of the Superior Court of California for the County of Los Angeles from 1964 to 1978. He was an associate justice of the California Court of Appeal Second Appellate District from 1978 to 1979.

Federal judicial service

On August 28, 1979, Alarcón was nominated by President Jimmy Carter to a new seat on the United States Court of Appeals for the Ninth Circuit created by 92 Stat. 1629. He was confirmed by the United States Senate on October 31, 1979, and received his commission on November 2, 1979. He assumed senior status on November 21, 1992, and served until his death in Pacific Palisades, California, on January 28, 2015.

Academic posts

Alarcón was an adjunct professor at the Southwestern University School of Law from 1985 to 2015, and was an adjunct professor at Loyola Marymount School of Law in 1993 and 1994.

See also
List of first minority male lawyers and judges in the United States
List of Hispanic/Latino American jurists

References

External links
 
 Arthur Alarcón receives an honorary degree

1925 births
2015 deaths
Burials at Arlington National Cemetery
District attorneys in California
Hispanic and Latino American judges
Judges of the California Courts of Appeal
Judges of the United States Court of Appeals for the Ninth Circuit
Lawyers from Los Angeles
Loyola Marymount University faculty
Superior court judges in the United States
United States Army soldiers
United States court of appeals judges appointed by Jimmy Carter
USC Gould School of Law alumni
University of Southern California alumni
20th-century American judges
United States Army personnel of World War II